Sue Ramsey MLA (born 1970) is an Irish Republican politician.

Early life and education
After growing up in Belfast, Ramsey studied catering. She represented the Poleglass and Twinbrook areas on Lisburn Borough Council from 1997 to 2005.

Career
In 1996 she was an unsuccessful candidate in the Northern Ireland Forum election in Lagan Valley, and failed to be elected at the next year's UK general election also in Lagan Valley, where she finished 6th out of eight candidates. Ramsey was elected to the Northern Ireland Assembly in 1998 as a Sinn Féin member for West Belfast. She lost her seat at the 2003 election, when she finished 87 votes behind Diane Dodds of the DUP in the closest inter-party result of the election but returned to the Assembly in 2004 as a substitute for Bairbre de Brún. She was then re-elected in 2007 and 2011.

Regarding fire service in Northern Ireland, Ramsey said it was crucial that problems within the Northern Fire and Rescue Service 'need to be tackled as soon as possible’ and that it was ‘worrying that the Fire Service has been allowed to get into such a poor state of management'.

References

External links
Official Sinn Féin biography

1970 births
Living people
Politicians from Belfast
Sinn Féin MLAs
Northern Ireland MLAs 1998–2003
Northern Ireland MLAs 2003–2007
Northern Ireland MLAs 2007–2011
Northern Ireland MLAs 2011–2016
Female members of the Northern Ireland Assembly
20th-century women politicians from Northern Ireland
Sinn Féin councillors in Northern Ireland
Members of Lisburn City Council
Sinn Féin parliamentary candidates
Women councillors in Northern Ireland